Joseph Hugh Brain (11 September 1863 – 26 June 1914) was an English cricketer. He was educated at Clifton College and Oriel College, Oxford, and played cricket for Gloucestershire between 1883 and 1889.

He became managing director of the family brewery, S. A. Brain & Co. Ltd in Cardiff, which was founded by his father and brother, and served on the board of Cardiff City F.C.

References

1863 births
1914 deaths
English cricketers
Gloucestershire cricketers
Cricketers from Bristol
Oxford University cricketers
Marylebone Cricket Club cricketers
Gentlemen cricketers
Glamorgan cricketers
People educated at Clifton College
Alumni of Oriel College, Oxford
English brewers
Cardiff City F.C. directors and chairmen
19th-century English businesspeople